Kochukovo is a rural locality (a village) in Kurilovskoye Rural Settlement, Sobinsky District, Vladimir Oblast, Russia. The population was 1 as of 2010.

Geography 
Kochukovo is located on the Vorsha River, 13 km north of Sobinka (the district's administrative centre) by road. Rybkhoz Vorsha is the nearest rural locality.

References 

Rural localities in Sobinsky District
Vladimirsky Uyezd